Bombay Castle, also known in ; Mandarin ; Abad Santos Shoal, is a shoal with a lighthouse in the Rifleman Bank of the southern Spratly Islands. It is occupied by Vietnam, but also claimed by China (PRC) and Taiwan (ROC).

Location and topography
At its shallowest point, it has a depth of  consisting of sand and coral.

The lighthouse is two storied, with accommodation for the lighthouse keepers and a dish antenna.

The reef is named after the East Indiaman .

DK1 rigs
In addition to the lighthouse (DK1/21), three other DK1 rigs ("economic, scientific and technological service stations") have been constructed by Vietnam in this area.  The current (2015) cluster has 3 rigs in use. 
 DK1/4: Completed 16 June 1989, was the 2nd DK1 rig completed. It collapsed on the night of 4 December 1990 during a heavy storm. 
 DK1/9: Completed 22 August 1993.
 DK1/20: Completed 13 August 1998. 
 DK1/21: Completed 19 August 1998. This rig includes a lighthouse.

See also
List of maritime features in the Spratly Islands

References

External links
 Vietnamese lighthouse on Bombay Castle (photo)
 NGA chart 93049 showing Rifleman, Southwest and Vanguard Banks, (7-9N,109-112E), oceangrafix.com
 Larger scale charts also showing Vietnam coast: NGA chart 93020 (7-10N,104-110E), NGA chart 93030 (9-16N,105-116E), oceangrafix.com   
 DK1 rigs photo gallery, hoangsa.org
 Bombay Castle

Rifleman Bank